Maria Mitzeva (born October 20, 1938 in Plovdiv, Bulgaria) is a Bulgarian born American pop singer.

Early life 

Mitzeva graduated in 1957 from the National School of Music Sofia, Bulgaria.

Career 

Mitzeva recorded and performed with The Bulgarian National Radio and Television Orchestra, German Radio and Television, Austrian Television, Russian Radio and Television. She moved to the United States in 1970. She performed extensively in North America and has been called by the press "the female Tom Jones"

Awards 

 Gold medal and first place at The World Olympiad of Pop Singers and Songs 1969 Athens, Greece
 Gold Medal of Radio Barcelona 1969
 Golden Lowe Award in 1967 Leipzig, Germany
 The Golden Orpheus Festival 1968, Sunny Beach, Bulgaria.

Personal life 
She married producer, composer and conductor Michael-Mihran Vartan in 1969. They reside in Palm Desert, California.

References

External links 
 

1938 births
Living people
People from Palm Desert, California
20th-century Bulgarian women singers
Bulgarian emigrants to the United States
20th-century American women singers
20th-century American singers
21st-century American women